†Carelia paradoxa was a species of small, air-breathing, land snail, a terrestrial pulmonate gastropod mollusk in the family  Amastridae and superfamily Cochlicopoidea.

This species was endemic to the Hawaiian Islands. It became extinct in the first half of the 20th century.

References

 

Carelia (gastropod)
Extinct gastropods
Taxonomy articles created by Polbot